John Aston Warder (January 19, 1812 – July 14, 1883) was a physician, influential leader in the fields of horticulture and forestry, and founder of the American Forestry Association.  He was among the first to propose the planting of belts of trees on the great western plains.

He died at the John Aston Warder House in North Bend, Ohio in 1883.

References

External resources
"January 19, 1812: John Aston Warder, Founder of the American Forestry Association, is Born". Peeling Back the Bark, the Forest History Society.

1812 births
1883 deaths
American conservationists
History of forestry in the United States
American foresters